Bam language may refer to:
Biem language (Austronesian)
Bam, a dialect of the Wantoat language (Papuan)